Chicot State Park is located near Ville Platte, Louisiana. This wildlife reserve of South Central Louisiana features  of rolling hills surrounding a  man-made lake stocked with bass, crappie (sac-au-lait), bluegill, and red-ear sunfish. Chicot Park offers fishing boat rentals, pavilions, barbecue pits, picnic areas, restrooms, primitive hike-to campsites, lodges, and furnished cabins. The park is home to a number of wild animal species, including whitetail deer, raccoons, coyotes, and bobcats.

History
One of the older Louisiana parks, the park was added to the Louisiana State Park system in 1939. Under the direction of the National Park Service, the Civilian Conservation Corps significantly developed the area.

Activities
Fishing is encouraged at the park with a boathouse, three boat launches, and boat rental facilities. The waters of Lake Chicot are habitat to largemouth bass, crappie, bluegill, and red-ear sunfish.

A hiking/backpacking trail encircles the lake and supports several primitive campsites. The trail is tailored for mountain bikes and cycling is encouraged throughout the park. The park includes a  hiking trail.

The southern landing includes cabins, group camp, lodge, picnic areas, playgrounds, and water playground. The northern landing features campsites, lodges, and a primitive group-camping area. The East landing includes a meeting room and barbecue pavilion.

See also
Louisiana State Arboretum
List of Louisiana state parks

References

External links

Chicot State Park

Protected areas of Evangeline Parish, Louisiana
State parks of Louisiana